Royce Concerto is the second studio album by American classical pianist and composer Richard Kastle. It is also a three movement concerto for piano and orchestra, that was composed by Kastle and included in the album. The Philharmonia Orchestra also performs on the album released by Yum Recordings on September 30, 1997.

About the Concerto
This concerto was created after Kastle was invited to perform at UCLA’s Royce Hall. After the invitation, he went to work on some music designed especially for the venue and its difficult acoustics. By the time he finished the Royce Concerto and before the contracts were signed, organizers had changed their minds about booking him. He refused to change the name.

About the Recording
It was recorded by Virgin Records in 1992 using the same production team and studio as Streetwise (album). The piano was recorded and mixed a Minnesota Public radio, Studio M, St. Paul, MN. The orchestra was recorded at Blackheath Halls in London.

Track listing
Music composed by Richard Kastle (except track 12)1. Boardwalk RondoRoyce Concerto (tracks 2-4)2. Adagio Molto  3. Andante4. Moderato5. Mirror Pool (Piano Concerto No 6)6. Desert Sky7. Ida's Love Theme (Titanic Symphony)8. Adagio9. Tempest10. Nocturne in A Minor11. Prelude in E12. Polonaise in A Flat, Frédéric Chopin

Credits
Executive Producer: Roger Holdredge
Produced by Steve Barnett
Engineered by Preston Smith
Orchestrated by Richard Kastle
Conducted by Steve Barnett
Design: Wj Mauer
Photography: Frank Franca
Tenor Saxophone soloist on Desert Sky: Brian Grivna

References

External links
 Richard Kastle's Piano Concertos

Richard Kastle albums
1997 albums